Raymond Benedict McCarey (September 6, 1904 – December 1, 1948) was an American film director, brother of director Leo McCarey.

Biography
McCarey began working at Hal Roach Studios, where he did work on short films with Our Gang and Laurel and Hardy. He also worked with Roscoe Arbuckle, the Three Stooges, Lucille Ball, Bing Crosby, Louis Armstrong and Dorothy Dandridge among many others. Most of his feature film work consisted of "B" pictures and low-budget films. He directed 62 films between 1930 and 1948.

He was the younger brother of director Leo McCarey and was occasionally billed as Raymond McCarey but usually as Ray McCarey.

On December 2, 1948, McCarey was found dead kneeling beside his bed. According to the San Bernardino County Sun, two empty prescription bottles were found by his bed. His brother Leo McCarey said he had been in ill health for several months. The official cause of death was suicide.

Selected filmography

 Swing High (1930)
 Two Plus Fours (1930)
 Free Eats (1932)
 Scram! (1932)
 Pack Up Your Troubles (1932)
 In the Dough (1932)
 Close Relations (1933)
 Tomalio (1933)
 Girl o' My Dreams (1934)
 Men in Black (1934)
 Three Little Pigskins (1934)
 Sunset Range (1935)
 Three Cheers for Love (1936)
 Oh, Doctor (1937)
 Goodbye Broadway (1938)
 Outside These Walls (1939)
 You Can't Fool Your Wife (1940)
 It Happened in Flatbush (1942)
 That Other Woman (1942)
 Passport to Destiny (1944)
 Atlantic City (1944)
 Strange Triangle (1946)
 The Falcon's Alibi (1946)

References

External links

1904 births
1948 deaths
1948 suicides
Hal Roach Studios filmmakers
Film directors from Los Angeles